Vini Ricordi–Pinarello–Sidermec was an Italian professional cycling team that existed from 1982 to 1986. It participated in the 1983 Tour de France; it won the mountains classification with Lucien Van Impe and won three stages.

References

Further reading
 

Cycling teams based in Italy
Defunct cycling teams based in Italy
1982 establishments in Italy
1986 disestablishments in Italy
Cycling teams established in 1982
Cycling teams disestablished in 1986